The Church of Saint Ivo of the Bretons is a Roman Catholic church dedicated to Saint Ivo of Kermartin, patron of Brittany. It is one of the national churches in Rome dedicated to Brittany.

History 

Pope Callixtus III (1455-1458) gave the church of St. Andrea de Mortarariis to the Breton community in Rome. It became a center for assistance to Breton pilgrims. The church was pulled down and rebuilt in 1878 by Luca Carimini in Neo-Renaissance style.

The hypothesis that the elements of the ancient church walls have been retained in the new construction, which consists of buildings and the new church, is founded. The maintenance of the old apse, would coincide with the current chapel of the Blessed Virgin (Santa Vergine). Some considerations in support of this hypothesis relate to the form of the new church. The persistence of the masonry structure of the apse, with its proportions, would have affected the plan and the elevation development. The 90 ° rotation of the axis of the church (necessary for obtaining a building of smaller dimensions in the same lot), would have required the construction of a symmetric chapel, equally great.

Notes

References 

 
 
  François Macé de Lépinay, "Architecture religieuse à Rome à la fin du xixe siècle: la reconstruction de Saint-Yves-des-Bretons",  Les fondations nationales dans la Rome pontificale, Collection de l'École Française de Rome 52, Académie de France Villa Médicis et École Française de Rome Palais Farnèse, 1981, p. 433

National churches in Rome
Ivo Bretoni